The Deira Corniche is a waterfront promenade in Dubai, United Arab Emirates.  The Deira Corniche, sometimes also referred to as the Dubai Corniche lies in northeastern Dubai, in Deira.  The Deira Corniche is flanked to the north by the Persian Gulf and consists of a broad pedestrian walkway that extends to the Dubai Creek.

A contract for the construction of the corniche was signed on September 23, 1975, for a price of US$ 25 million by Hamdan bin Rashid Al Maktoum, the former deputy ruler of Dubai. A variety of traditional and modern retail and hospitality areas exist along the Deira Corniche.  The corniche borders the localities of Al Dhagaya, Ayil Nasir and Al Hamriya Port, all of which are part of the larger Deira central business district.  The Dubai Fish and Vegetable Market as well as the Dubai Gold Souk and Dubai Spice Souk are located within the proximity of the corniche.  The Hyatt Regency Dubai lies on route D 90 (Al Khaleej Road), which runs parallel to the Deira Corniche.

A US$ 1.3 billion project was initiated in 2004 to restructure the area between the westend of the creek in Deira and Al Hamriya Port, which will involve new residential developments, hotels and the development of Palm Deira off the northeastern coast of Dubai.

A similar promenade also exists on the Bur Dubai side of the Creek, extending from Al Ghubaiba to Al Seef Marine Station.

References 

Buildings and structures completed in 1975
Streets in Dubai
Tourist attractions in Dubai
Waterfronts